Marius Alecu (born 16 June 1979) is a Romanian weightlifter. He competed in the men's super heavyweight event at the 2000 Summer Olympics.

References

External links
 

1979 births
Living people
Romanian male weightlifters
Olympic weightlifters of Romania
Weightlifters at the 2000 Summer Olympics
Sportspeople from Bucharest
20th-century Romanian people
21st-century Romanian people